PLFA may refer to:
Polish American Football League
Phospholipid-derived fatty acids 

Poor Little Fella Association